João Panji dos Santos Soares (born 29 October 2000), commonly known as João Panji, is an East Timorese footballer who currently plays as a defender for Assalam.

Career statistics

International

References

2000 births
Living people
East Timorese footballers
Timor-Leste international footballers
Association football defenders